Rhacophorus orlovi is a species of frog in the family Rhacophoridae. The species is endemic to Southeast Asia.

Etymology
The specific name, orlovi, is in honor of Russian herpetologist Nikolai Lusteranovich Orlov.

Geographic range
R. orlovi is found in Laos, Thailand, and Vietnam.

Habitat
The natural habitats of R. orlovi are subtropical or tropical moist lowland forests, rivers, freshwater marshes, and intermittent freshwater marshes.

Conservation status
R. orlovi is threatened by habitat loss.

References

Further reading
Ziegler T, Köhler J (2001). "Rhacophorus orlovi sp. n., a new tree frog from Vietnam (Amphibia: Anura: Rhacophoridae)". Sauria 2001 (3): 37–46. (Rhacophorus orlovi, new species).

orlovi
Frogs of Asia
Amphibians described in 2001
Taxonomy articles created by Polbot